Rai Kids (called Rai Ragazzi in Italian) is an Italian production company based in Turin. It is owned and operated by Radiotelevisione Italiana (RAI), the national broadcasting company of Italy.

The company produces shows for children and is directed by Luca Milano, former deputy director of Rai Fiction.

References

Ragazzi
Mass media companies established in 2010
Film production companies of Italy
Mass media companies of Italy